The Ajang Ajang group is a cell within the terrorist organization Abu Sayyaf. The Ajang Ajang group is active within the southern Philippines. The group specializes in attacks using two bombs. The word Ajang Ajang is Tausug word for "orphans", describing the group consists of people who lost a loved one due to war.

Terrorist acts 
On December 31, 2018, one of two bombs exploded and killed two persons and wounded 34 in South Seas Mall in Cotabato City. The two bombs carried the signature of the Ajang Ajang's elders, Islamic State.

The Ajang Ajang group claimed to be behind the Jolo Cathedral bombings on January 27, 2019, that killed 20 people and injured 102, and are suspected to be behind the mosque bombing in Talon-Talon, Zamboanga City, that caused 2 fatalities and 4 injuries.

References

Abu Sayyaf
Anti-communist organizations
Jihadist groups
Organizations based in Asia designated as terrorist
Organized crime groups in the Philippines
Moro conflict
Islamic terrorism in Malaysia
Organisations designated as terrorist by the United Kingdom
Organisations designated as terrorist by Australia
Organisations designated as terrorist by Japan
Organizations designated as terrorist by the United States
Islamic terrorism in the Philippines
Salafi jihadists